André Ferren (9 January 1943) was a French international rugby league player.

Biography 
Before his rugby league career, Ferren practiced track and field in Avignon, at Stade Saint Ruf. During a training session he entered into the  local rugby league team, which also trained at the same facility.
He played for Avignonand then, for  Marseille,  at club level and also represented France at international level, playing the 1968 Rugby League World Cup, earning 5 international caps in his overall career. Outside the game, he worked as a physical training instructor.

Honours 

 Rugby league:
 French Championship: Runner-up in 1973 (Marseille)
 Lord Derby Cup: Champion in 1971 (Marseille)
 Rugby League World Cup: Runner-up in 1968 (France)

References 

 

1943 births
France national rugby league team players
French rugby league players
Marseille XIII players
Rugby league wingers
Sporting Olympique Avignon players
Sportspeople from Vaucluse